Global public–private partnership (GPPP) is a governance mechanism to foster public–private partnership (PPP) cooperation between an international intergovernmental organisation like the United Nations and private companies.

Existing GPPPs strive, among other things, to increase affordable access to essential drugs in developing countries, and to promote handwashing with soap to reduce diarrhoea. (see Global Handwashing Day)

Some of the work of the World Health Organization (WHO) may be considered global public–private partnerships (GPPPs). The WHO is financed through the UN system by contributions from member states. In recent years, WHO's work has involved more collaboration with NGOs and the pharmaceutical industry in Product development partnerships to create vaccines for diseases that primarily afflict third world countries. The WHO also works closely with foundations such as the Bill and Melinda Gates Foundation and the Rockefeller Foundation.  In 2012, 15% of WHO's total revenues was financed by private sources.

GPPPs are an example of multistakeholder governance which is a key target of United Nations Sustainable Development Goal 17. In particular, target 17.17 is formulated as: "Encourage effective partnerships: Encourage and promote effective public, public-private and civil society partnerships, building on the experience and resourcing strategies of partnerships." This target has one Indicator: Indicator 17.17.1 is the "Amount in United States dollars committed to public-private partnerships for infrastructure.

See also
OECD Development Centre

References

External links
Institute for Public–Private Partnership Poland

Public–private partnership